B.S. Pully (born Murray Lerman; May 14, 1910 – January 6, 1972) was a New York nightclub comedian and stage actor who created the role of "Big Jule" in the musical Guys and Dolls. He was noted for his blue humor and thick, gravelly voice.

Born in Newark, New Jersey, Pully began his career on the Borscht Belt and achieved fame originating the Big Jule role in the original Broadway production of Guys and Dolls, appearing in more than 1,000 performances. He also played the role in the 1955 film version. Other notable film roles include the gruff Christmas tree vendor in 1945's A Tree Grows in Brooklyn and Joe the Bartender in 1945's Nob Hill.

Pully died of a heart attack in Thomas Jefferson University Hospital in Philadelphia, Pennsylvania, at age 61. He was buried in Cedar Park Cemetery, Emerson, New Jersey.

Filmography

References

External links

 

 

American male stage actors
American male film actors
American stand-up comedians
1910 births
1972 deaths
20th-century American male actors
Male actors from Newark, New Jersey
Comedians from New Jersey
Burials at Cedar Park Cemetery (Emerson, New Jersey)
20th-century American comedians